The Barker Building, a seven-story apartment building located at 306 South 15th Street in Downtown Omaha, Nebraska, United States. Built in 1929, it was listed on the National Register of Historic Places on July 2, 2008. The sons of prominent, early Omaha minister Joseph Barker named this building in honor of their father. Architectural firm Allan and Wallace, local masters, provided the design for this building. An example of the Neo-Gothic Revival style, the building was constructed by contractor Kiewit Construction with characteristics of the Traditional Modernism period. After 70 years and numerous owners, the Barker Building was boarded up in 1999. In 2012, an 8.8 million dollar remodeling project was begun to convert the structure into a 48-unit apartment building.

See also 
 History of Omaha

References 

National Register of Historic Places in Omaha, Nebraska
History of Omaha, Nebraska
Commercial buildings on the National Register of Historic Places in Nebraska
Office buildings completed in 1929